Adolphe Van Tiggelen (1914–1969) was a Belgian scientist and professor at the University of Louvain (UCLouvain). He made important contributions to the understanding of flame processes. In 1961, he was awarded the Francqui Prize on Exact Sciences.

See also
Combustion Institute

External links
 The Combustion Institute (history of Belgian section)

Belgian physicists
Academic staff of the Université catholique de Louvain
1914 births
1969 deaths